Welch is a surname that comes from the Old English word , meaning ‘foreign’ (from walhaz). It was used to describe those of Celtic or Welsh origin. Welch and another common surname, Walsh, share this derivation.  Welsh is the most common form in Scotland, while in Ireland (where the name was carried by the Anglo-Norman invasion), the form of Walsh predominates.

Notable people with the surname "Welch"

A
Adam Cleghorn Welch (1864–1943), Scottish clergyman
Adonijah Welch (1821–1889), American politician
Ailsa A. Welch, English epidemiologist
Alan Welch (1910–1980), Australian rules footballer
Alexander Welch (1873–1962), Canadian politician
Alexander McMillan Welch (1869–1943), American architect
Alford Welch, American professor
Amy Welch (born 1985), English journalist
Andrew Welch (disambiguation), multiple people
Ann Welch (1917–2002), English pilot
Anthony Cleland Welch (born 1945), British military officer
Aristides Welch (1811–1890), American racehorse breeder
Art Welch (born 1944), Jamaican soccer player
Ashbel Welch (1809–1882), American civil engineer
Asher Welch (born 1944), Jamaican soccer player

B
Benjamin Welch (1818–1863), American politician
Bernard Lewis Welch (1911–1989), British statistician
Bettina Welch (1922–1993), New Zealand actress
Bill Welch (1941–2009), American politician
Bo Welch (born 1951), American film director
Bob Welch (disambiguation), multiple people
Bradley Welch (born 1989), Trinidadian-American soccer player
Brian Welch (born 1970), American musician
Brian Welch (ski jumper) (born 1984), American ski jumper
Bruce Welch (born 1941), English musician
Bryan Welch, American publisher
Buster Welch (born 1928), American horse trainer

C
Carolyn Welch (1929–2020), American figure skater
Charles H. Welch (1880–1967), English theologian
Chris Welch (born 1941), English music critic
Christian Welch (born 1994), Australian rugby league footballer
Christopher Evan Welch (1965–2013), American actor
Chuck Welch (born 1948), American artist
Claude Welch (disambiguation), multiple people
Claxton Welch (born 1947), American football player
Coley Welch (1919–2000), American boxer
Colin Welch (1924–1997), English journalist
Craig Welch (1948–2020), Canadian animator
Cris Welch, American football coach
Cullum Welch (1895–1980), British businessman
Curt Welch (1862–1896), American baseball player

D
Damien Welch (born 1982), Welsh rugby union footballer
Daniel Welch (disambiguation), multiple people
Danny Welch (disambiguation), multiple people
Dave Welch, English poker player
Dave Welch (admiral) (born 1961), American admiral
David Welch (disambiguation), multiple people
Denis Welch (1945–2014), British racing driver
Denise Welch (born 1958), British actress
Denton Welch (1915–1948), English writer
Dick Welch (1913–2002), Australian rules footballer
Don Welch (1932–2016), American poet
Dwight S. Welch (1874–1962), American farmer and politician

E
Ed Welch (born 1947), English composer
Edward Welch (disambiguation), multiple people
Edwin Welch (1838–1916), English photographer
Elisabeth Welch (1904–2003), American singer and actress
Elizabeth M. Welch (born 1970), American lawyer
Elwyn Welch (1925–1961), New Zealand farmer and missionary
Emanuel Chris Welch (born 1971), American politician
Evelyn Welch (born 1959), English-American scholar

F
Florence Welch (born 1986), English singer
Fran Welch (1895–1970), American football player and coach
Frank Welch (disambiguation), multiple people

G
Garry Welch (born 1955), New Zealand footballer
Garth Welch (born 1936), Australian dancer
George Welch (disambiguation), multiple people
Georgiana Welch (1792–1879), English religious figure
Gibby Welch (1904–1984), American football player
Gillian Welch (born 1967), American musician
Graeme Welch (born 1972), English cricketer
Greg Welch (born 1964), Australian triathlete
Gregory Welch, Canadian chemist
Gus Welch (1892–1970), American football player and track athlete

H
Harold Welch (1912–1995), American businessman
Harry Welch (disambiguation), multiple people
Henry Kirke White Welch (1821–1870), American lawyer and politician
Herbert Welch (disambiguation), multiple people
H. Gilbert Welch (born 1955), American physician
Howe Welch, American football player
Huck Welch (1907–1979), Canadian football player

I
Israel Victor Welch (1822–1869), American politician and lawyer
Ivo Welch (born 1963), American economist

J
Jack Welch (disambiguation), multiple people
James Welch (disambiguation), multiple people
Jane Welch (born 1964), English writer
Jane Meade Welch (1854–1931), American journalist
Janet Welch (1894–1959), English doctor
Janet Martin Welch, American librarian
Jason Welch (born 1989), American wrestler
Jay E. Welch (1925–2008), American musician
Jeffrey B. Welch (born 1954), American business executive
Jenna Welch (1919–2019), American bookkeeper
Jim Welch (1938–2017), American football player
John Welch (disambiguation), multiple people
Johnny Welch (1906–1940), American baseball player
Jonathon Welch (born 1958), Australian conductor
Joseph N. Welch (1890–1960), American lawyer
Julie Welch (born 1948), British sports journalist
Justin Welch (born 1972), British musician

K
Keith Welch (born 1968), English footballer
Kenneth Welch (1925–2006), American politician
Kevin Welch (born 1955), American singer
Kristian Welch (born 1998), American football player

L
Larry D. Welch (born 1934), American Air Force general
Lawrence Welch (born 1945), Australian theorist
Lawrence E. Welch Jr., American judge
Lenny Welch (born 1938), American singer
Leo Welch (1932–2017), American musician
Leslie Welch (1907–1980), British radio personality
Lew Welch (1926–1971), American poet
Lewis Welch (1814–1878), American politician 
Lloyd R. Welch (born 1927), American information theorist
Longino Welch, American track and field athlete
Lorne Welch (1916–1998), English engineer
Louie Welch (1918–2008), American politician
Lucas Welch (born 1974), American entrepreneur
Lucia Foster Welch (1864–1940), English politician

M
Mabel Rose Welch (1871–1959), American painter
Madison Welch (born 1988), British model
Malcolm Welch, English priest
Marion Foster Welch (1851–1935), American house caretaker
Martha G. Welch (born 1944), American physician
Martin Welch (1864–1935), American schooner captain
Mary Welch (1922–1958), American actress
Mary Beaumont Welch (1841–1923), American educator and suffragist
Mary-Scott Welsh (1919–1995), American writer
Matt Welch (born 1968), American blogger
Matthew Welch (born 1976), American composer
Michael Welch (disambiguation), multiple people
Mickey Welch (1859–1941), American baseball player
Micky Welch (born 1957), Barbadian-English footballer
Milt Welch (1924–2019), American baseball player
Monster Mike Welch (born 1979), American guitarist
Myra Brooks Welch (1877–1959), American poet

N
Neville Welch (1906–1999), English priest
Nick Welch (disambiguation), multiple people
Niles Welch (1888–1976), American performer
Noah Welch (born 1982), American ice hockey player
Norval E. Welch (1835–1864), American colonel
Nugent Welch (1881–1970), New Zealand artist

O
Olivia Scott Welch (born 1998), American actress

P
Patrick Welch (disambiguation), multiple people
Peggy Welch (born 1955), American nurse and politician
Peter Welch (born 1947), American politician
Peter Welch (actor) (1922–1984), British actor
Phil J. Welch (1895–1963), American politician
Philip Welch (born 1954), British mathematician
Priscilla Welch (born 1944), British runner

R
Ralph Welch (1907–1974), American football player
Raquel Welch (1940–2023), American actress
Rebecca Welch, English football referee 
Reece Welch (born 2003), English footballer
Richard Welch (disambiguation), multiple people
Robert Welch (disambiguation), multiple people
Rod Welch, American professor
Roger Welch (born 1946), American artist
Ron Welch (born 1960), American military officer
Ronald Welch (1909–1982), British writer
Ronnie Welch (born 1952), English footballer
Roy Welch (1901–1977), American professional wrestler
Rudolph B. Welch (1850–1906), American attorney and educator
Rufus Welch (1800–1856), American impresario

S
Samuel Earl Welch (1892–1969), American attorney
Sandy Welch (born 1953), British television writer
Saunders Welch (1711–1784), English businessman
Savannah Welch (born 1984), American actress
Scott Welch (born 1968), British boxer
Sean Welch (born 1965), British musician
Sharon D. Welch (born 1952), American academic
Sian Welch (born 1954), American triathlete
Stanton Welch (born 1969), Australian dancer
Stephan Welch (born 1950), English priest
Stephen Welch (born 1972), American wheelchair tennis player
Stephen Welch (Medal of Honor) (1824–1906), American soldier
Steven Welch, American musician
Stuart Welch (born 1977), Australian rower
Stuart Cary Welch (1928–2008), American scholar
Suey Welch (1898/1899–1974), American boxing manager
Susan Welch, American political scientist
Suzy Welch (born 1959), American magazine editor

T
Tahnee Welch (born 1961), American actress
Tara Welch, American professor
Taylor Welch (born 1989), American rugby league footballer
Ted Welch (1892–1943), American baseball player
Terry Welch (1939–1988), American computer scientist
Thaddeus Welch (1844–1919), American painter
Thomas Welch (disambiguation), multiple people
Trevor Welch, Irish sports commentator
Tub Welch (1866–1901), American baseball player

V
Vernon S. Welch (1906–1980), American lawyer and politician
Vince Welch (born 1964), American media personality
Vivian Welch, Canadian epidemiologist

W
Werburg Welch (1894–1990), English nun and artist
Will Welch (born 1990), Australian rugby union footballer
William Welch (disambiguation), multiple people
Wilton Welch (1884–??), Australian actor and filmmaker
Winfield Welch (1899–1980), American baseball player
Winona Hazel Welch (1896–1990), American bryologist
W. Wilbert Welch (1918–2015), American pastor

Fictional characters
Lou Welch, fictional character from Babylon 5

See also
Welch (disambiguation), a disambiguation page for Welch
Walsh (disambiguation), a disambiguation page for Walsh
Walsh (surname), people with the surname Walsh
Walshe (surname), people with the surname Walshe
Welsh (surname), people with the surname Welsh
Wallace (surname), people with the surname Wallace
General Welch (disambiguation), a page with Generals surnamed Welch
Justice Welch (disambiguation), a page with Justices surnamed Welch
Senator Welch (disambiguation), a page with Senators surnamed Welch

References 

English-language surnames
Surnames of Irish origin
Ethnonymic surnames